Portalegre may refer to:

Brazil
 Portalegre, Rio Grande do Norte, a municipality in the state of Rio Grande do Norte in the Northeast region of Brazil.

Portugal
 Portalegre District, a district in Portugal
 Portalegre, Portugal, a municipality in the district of Portalegre
 Castle of Portalegre, a medieval castle in the civil parish of Sé e São Lourenço, municipality of Portalegre
 Portalegre Football Association, a district governing body for the all football competitions in the Portuguese district of Portalegre.
 Portalegre wine, a Portuguese wine region centered on the Portalegre.
 Count of Portalegre, was a Portuguese title of nobility.

See also
 Porto Alegre (disambiguation)